The electoral division of Western Tiers was an electorate of the Tasmanian Legislative Council, the division was abolished in 2017. The seat was created in 2008 after a redistribution saw the former Rowallan renamed after the Great Western Tiers mountain range in Tasmania's central highlands (the word "Great" was omitted for simplicity).

Members

See also

 Electoral division of Rowallan
 Tasmanian House of Assembly

References

External links
Parliament of Tasmania
Tasmanian Electoral Commission - Legislative Council

Former electoral districts of Tasmania
Western Tiers